The Ford Flex is a full-size crossover SUV or MPV that was manufactured by the Ford Motor Company; a single generation was produced from the 2009 to 2019 model years. Introduced as the successor to the Ford Taurus X, the model line also functionally replaced the Ford Freestar minivan. Slightly larger than its predecessor, the Flex was sized alongside the full-sized Ford Explorer in the Ford model line, being marginally longer, yet not as tall as the Explorer.

Introduced in 2005 as a concept vehicle, the Flex shifted body configurations from an MPV to a 5-door wagon for production to better meet consumer demand.  The model line is based on the Ford D4 chassis architecture, a flexible-wheelbase variant of the Ford D3 platform.  The D4 chassis was also shared by the 2011-2019 Explorer and the Lincoln MKT; while sharing no body panels, the MKT served as a direct counterpart of the Flex.

From June 2008 until its withdrawal, the Ford Flex was manufactured by Ford Canada at Oakville Assembly (Oakville, Ontario); the Flex and the Lincoln MKT were produced alongside the Ford Edge and Lincoln MKX (today, Lincoln Nautilus).  The Flex was marketed in the United States, Canada, Mexico, and the Middle East.

Background

At the 2005 Chicago Auto Show, Ford unveiled the Ford Fairlane concept vehicle.  Derived from the mid-size Ford CD3 platform (to be used by the 2006 Ford Fusion sedan), the vehicle was a 3-row MPV with multiple distinctive styling elements.  The rear passenger doors of the Fairlane were rear-hinged; this configuration was chosen to provide better interior views when on display.  When the doors were closed, the configuration appeared similar to a production minivan.

The concept vehicle was approved for 2009 production as the Ford Flex.  Along with the name change, several extensive changes were made from the Fairlane concept, while the styling was largely left intact.  The vehicle was increased in size, shifting from the CD3 chassis to the full-size D4 platform.  While replacing the Freestar minivan, the design abandoned sliding doors for front-hinged doors, in line with a station wagon.

Styled by former Volvo designer Peter Horbury, the Flex was distinguished by its straight-lined exterior, adding horizontal grooves in the doors and tailgate (evoking a Woodie).  To visually lower the exterior, the Flex was designed with a "floating roof"; all the roof pillars were painted black with a white-painted roof (the latter, similar to the Mini).  Car Design News said the styling referenced "a previous era without resorting to obvious retro styling cues."

Design overview
The Ford Flex was based on the Ford D4 chassis architecture, a version of the D3 platform re-engineered for use for multiple wheelbases.  The model line was offered with front-wheel drive as standard, with all-wheel drive as an option.  The Flex was designed with an independent rear suspension system and a traction control system called AdvanceTrac.

Powertrain
The Ford Flex is powered by two different 3.5 L V6 engines, both paired to a 6-speed automatic transmission.  The standard engine was a naturally-aspirated Duratec V6; initially producing 262 hp, the engine was increased in output to 287 hp for 2013.

As an option for all-wheel drive vehicles, a twin-turbocharged EcoBoost V6 produced 355 hp, increased to 365 hp for 2013.

The all-wheel drive system is capable of transferring up to 100% of torque to the front or rear axle as needed.

Model history

2009–2012
At its 2009 introduction, the Flex was launched with three trim levels. As with other Ford cars, there was an SE base model, mid-level SEL, and top-trim Limited. It was available in six- or seven-passenger seating configurations, the latter having a bench seat for the second row. As part of the roof design, Ford offered three colors for the roof paint: silver, black, white/cream, and body-color.

In 2010, a second available engine was added, as a 355 hp twin-turbocharged EcoBoost V6 became available on SEL and Limited models with all-wheel drive standard. On US models, reverse cameras were restricted to Limited-trim models.

For 2012, an automatic parking system was added as option for upper-trim models.

2013–2019
For the 2013 model year, the Flex received a mid-cycle facelift, introduced at the 2011 LA Auto Show.  While the roofline and doors were retained, the front and rear saw major changes. The former consisted of a new grille design with no Ford emblem; the model name was placed on the hood above the grille instead. On the tailgate, the Ford emblem was decreased in size and moved to the bottom right corner. Inside, the dashboard was updated, with a new 3-spoke steering wheel. starting in 2013 the previous steering wheel mounted paddle shifters were removed in favor of up/down gear selection buttons on the main gear selector.

The 2019 model year Flex only had minor changes, and was the final year for the vehicle.

Trim levels

Since its introduction in 2009, the Ford Flex has only been available in three trim levels:

The base SE, only available with front-wheel-drive (FWD), offers the following features as standard equipment: a 3.5 L "DuraTec" V6 engine, a six-speed automatic transmission, seventeen-inch aluminum wheels, an AM/FM stereo with a single-disc CD/MP3 player and an auxiliary audio input jack (later, Ford SYNC also became standard equipment on this trim level), a six-speaker audio system, cloth seating surfaces, aluminum interior trim panels, keyless entry, power windows, power door locks, black side mirrors and door handles, and manually controlled two-row air conditioning.

The mid-level SEL, available with either FWD OR all-wheel-drive (AWD), all-wheel drive equipped SELs had the ecoboost v6 as an option (only for the 2010 model year), added eighteen-inch wheels, Ford SYNC, an AM/FM stereo with satellite radio, a six-disc, in-dash CD/MP3 changer and an auxiliary audio input jack (later, MyFord Touch or SYNC 3 became standard equipment on this trim level), a seven-speaker premium audio system with external amplifier and rear-mounted subwoofer, a power front driver's seat, a security system, color-keyed door handles, and automatically controlled two-row air conditioning.

The top-of-the-line Limited, available with either FWD OR AWD, added nineteen-inch chrome-plated wheels, a GPS navigational system (later with MyFord Touch or SYNC 3), leather-trimmed seating surfaces, dual power front seats, heated and ventilated dual front seats, a driver's memory system, push-button ignition and remote start with keyless access (on later models ONLY), a dual-panel panoramic moonroof, a Sony audio system, rear-mounted subwoofer, and external surround-sound amplifier, and chrome-plated side mirrors (in 2013 it was changed to body color mirror caps) and door handles.

On 2011 and 2012 models, an additional Titanium trim level was available, which was the Limited with blacked out headlights, tail lights, rear appliqué, 3 bar grille without the Ford logo, blacked out beltline trim, foglamp bezels, and mirror caps. It had different interior trim, upholstery and was only available in Black, White, Red and Silver.

A Sport Appearance Package was available on the SEL and Limited, which featured gloss black side mirrors, door handles, and fascia inserts, twenty-inch wheels, a two-tone black-and-gray leather-trimmed interior, and aluminum interior trim panels.

A limited-production Funkmaster Flex Edition was available between 2009 and 2010. It was based on the Titanium trim and offered largely the same features, though was only available in a special two-tone red and black paint scheme, special twenty-inch chrome-plated alloy wheels and tires, gloss black side mirrors and door handles, gloss black fascia inserts, a red-and-black two-tone leather and suede-trimmed interior with a serialized dash plaque, "FMF" exterior emblems and interior embroidery, and red interior trim panels.

Marketing
As part of the "electrifying the night" campaign, Ford partnered with Esquire magazine in the magazine's first issue with a cover using E Ink.

Sales in the United States

Reception
In 2010 the Flex was listed as the third-best affordable mid- or full-sized SUV in US News, behind the Buick Enclave and Chevrolet Traverse.  The Flex Ecoboost is also the first ranked large affordable SUV according to Consumer Reports.  It is also ranked the most reliable large sized SUV and Ford's most reliable vehicle as ranked by Consumer Reports.  Ford Flex AWD was ranked highest of large SUVs by the percentage of owners who would definitely purchase that same vehicle again.

However, the Flex has not been as successful as original ambitions expected, with sales of less than half the target of 100,000  vehicles that Ford had expected to sell each year. Ford Flex sold 38,717 cars in 2009 compared to three larger competitors sales of 43,150 for the Buick Enclave, 91,074 for the Chevrolet Traverse and 83,118 for the Toyota Highlander in the same year.

References

External links

Flex
Full-size sport utility vehicles
Crossover sport utility vehicles
Ford D3 platform
All-wheel-drive vehicles
Front-wheel-drive vehicles
2010s cars
Goods manufactured in Canada
Cars introduced in 2007